Far Side of the World is the twenty-fourth studio album by American singer-songwriter Jimmy Buffett and was released on March 19, 2002. It was Buffet's first album since forming his own record label Mailboat Records in 1999.

Track listing
"Blue Guitar" (Roger Guth, Peter Mayer) - 4:28
"Mademoiselle (Voulez-Vous Danser)" (Lennie Gallant) - 4:07
"Autour Du Rocher" (Jimmy Buffett, Henri Ledee, Leon Ledee, Marcel Limodin, Jean-Jacques Kraif) - 8:05
"Savannah Fare You Well" (Hugh Prestwood) - 4:28
"All the Ways I Want You" (Bruce Cockburn)- 4:17
"Last Man Standing" (Mac McAnally, Jimmy Buffett) - 3:45
"What if the Hokey-Pokey Is All It Really Is About?" (Jimmy Buffett, Mac McAnally, C. Macak, T. Baker, L. Laprise) - 4:24
"Altered Boy" (Jimmy Buffett, Wayne Jobson) - 7:18
"USS Zydecoldsmobile" (Sonny Landreth) - 4:55
"Someday I Will" (Jimmy Buffett, Matt Betton) - 3:13
"Far Side of the World" (Jimmy Buffett) - 5:48
"Tonight I Just Need My Guitar" (Jimmy Buffett, Mac McAnally) - 2:52

Unused tracks
Buffett recorded two demos of songs entitled "Columbus” and “Asking Us To Dance”, with Columbus being based on the explorer Christopher Columbus, but did not make the album cut.  The demo is available for download on most Buffett fan sites and FTP collection sites. “Asking Us To Dance” is a song originally a song by Hugh Prestwood, who also wrote “Savannah Fare You Well”, another track on the album.

Cover photo and release date
The album cover was originally a photo of Buffett wearing a turban and sitting on a camel. This was changed and the release subsequently delayed following the events of September 11, 2001.

CD-DVD
The CD, if played on a computer with CD-ROM capability, includes the video for the title song.

References

Jimmy Buffett albums
2002 albums
Albums produced by Russ Titelman
Mailboat Records albums